Istanbul Governor's Office is the seat of the Governor of Istanbul Province. It is located at Cağaloğlu quarter of Fatih district of Istanbul, Turkey. It was the headquarters of the Ottoman Government, called the Sublime Porte, until the establishment of the Republic.

References

Buildings and structures of the Ottoman Empire
Government buildings completed in 1756
1756 establishments in the Ottoman Empire
Official residences in Turkey
Buildings and structures in Istanbul
Fatih